Girls Gone Wild  (GGW) is an adult entertainment franchise created by Joe Francis in 1997, who occasionally appears as the host of the videos.

Girls Gone Wild was known for its early use of direct-response marketing techniques, including its late-night infomercials that began airing in 1997. The videos typically involve camera crews at party locations engaging young college-aged women who expose their bodies or act "wild", especially during Spring break. Since 2008, the Girls Gone Wild products have been sold primarily through their website as streaming videos, downloads, and DVDs.

In February 2013, the company filed for Chapter 11 bankruptcy.

In 2014, the company was sold to Bang Bros.

Background 
The first Girls Gone Wild film was released in 1997. In 2001 the company sold 4.5 million videos and DVDs. By the end of 2002, the company had produced 83 different titles and had begun airing 30-minute infomercials on E! Entertainment Television, Fox Sports Net, BET, Comedy Central, Tech TV, Style, and all other major U.S. networks. The infomercials targeted a late-night channel-surfing demographic that Joe Francis had identified in the late 1990s. According to TNS Media Intelligence, Girls Gone Wild spent more than $21 million in advertising in 2003, becoming the largest advertiser for programs on the E! channel. In 2008, Francis' net worth was approximately $150 million.

Instances of Girls Gone Wild in popular culture include the appearance of Eminem and Snoop Dogg in the company's videos, as well as various references and parodies of the show in popular television series and movies. MGM announced in 2002 that it would release a feature-length film based on the Girls Gone Wild concept.

Content
Most Girls Gone Wild videos follow a common formula in which a film crew interacts with a large crowd of people either at a party, club, or other event. Women willingly take off their clothes, engage in sexual activities, or participate in wet T-shirt contests. Compensation for taking part in a Girls Gone Wild video often consists of a free hat, T-shirt, or money. Occasionally, participants are invited to be filmed on a Girls Gone Wild tour bus.

Distribution channels
At its inception, Girls Gone Wild marketed its product, namely videos, through direct-distribution channels such as infomercials, pay-per-view, and video on demand. This distribution was followed in 2008 by the launch of a Girls Gone Wild magazine, a clothing line, and a compilation record released on Jive Records.

Girls Gone Wild for Katrina
In September 2005, Girls Gone Wild announced that it would donate all proceeds of Mardi Gras–themed DVDs and videos to the Red Cross. Proceeds from the video sales, which included a title featuring Snoop Dogg, were intended to help the victims of Hurricane Katrina.

Guys Gone Wild
In 2004, Girls Gone Wild began soliciting men for participation in their videos. Guys Gone Wild was a video series and male analogue of Girls Gone Wild targeted at young women. These video tapes and DVDs featured much the same content as the Girls equivalent, only instead showing young men performing for the  camera—e.g., in the shower, playing football naked, etc.

In an article, Bill Horn, spokesman for Mantra Entertainment which produced the videos, notes a gender-related double standard in these videos. In the Girls Gone Wild series, sometimes the young women kiss, while the guys' series does not have that feature. Horn explains: "Let's face it, there's a double standard when it comes to guy-on-guy as opposed to girl-on-girl. It's sexy to see two girls making out. It's not considered sexy to see two guys making out. That's just the reality, and, we were there to capture the reality."

The hour-long Guys Gone Wild productions featured women camera operators who encouraged men to get naked and perform strip teases.

Legal
In 2003, the U.S. Department of Justice filed a complaint against Girls Gone Wild alleging that the company failed to notify customers when they purchased subscriptions under a continuity program, rather than single DVDs. In 2004, GGW settled for $1.1 million and agreed to disclose all terms and get consent for recurring charges.

In 2006, Girls Gone Wild marketer MRA Holdings pleaded guilty to charges for failing to record the ages of its subjects 2002 and 2003. The parties agreed to pay $2.1 million in restitution and fines.

In 2008, Ashley Dupré filed against Joe Francis and other defendants claiming that they filmed her without consent. Dupré dropped the suit after Francis released footage of her consent.

In 2008, a Missouri woman claimed that she was filmed without consent when a Girls Gone Wild contractor removed her halter top at a St. Louis bar. A jury found that she consented. On re-trial, a judge awarded the woman $5.77 million after the defense failed to show at court. On appeal, the judge upheld the verdict.

In March 2008, four women claimed that they suffered emotional distress by being shown in Girls Gone Wild film. In April 2011, an all-female jury declined to award damages to the plaintiffs. However, in January 2015, Francis agreed to settle a separate 2003 lawsuit which involved allegations of him taping the exposed breasts of underage girls as part of Girls Gone Wild content. The 2015 civil settlement also involved Francis agreeing to serve 336 days in jail after accepting a no contest plea to criminal charges of child abuse and prostitution.

Bankruptcy
In 2013, GGW Brands LLC filed for Chapter 11 bankruptcy protection.

Accounts from alleged sex victims
An episode of the TNT true crime anthology series Rich & Shameless called Girls Gone Wild Exposed aired on TNT on April 23, 2022, and featured accounts from alleged victims of Joe Francis who were employed for Girls Gone Wild.

References

Nudity in the United States
Mass media franchises
Films about fraternities and sororities
2010s pornographic films
2000s pornographic films
1990s pornographic films
Pornographic film series